Partula thalia was a species of air-breathing tropical land snail, a terrestrial pulmonate gastropod mollusk in the family Partulidae. This species was endemic to Ra'iātea, French Polynesia. It is now extinct.

References

External links

Partula (gastropod)
Extinct gastropods
Taxonomy articles created by Polbot
Taxobox binomials not recognized by IUCN
Gastropods described in 1884